The Parmanka is a river in Perm Krai and Komi Republic, Russia, a right tributary of the Chyornaya, which in turn is a tributary of the Veslyana.
The main tributary is the Parok (right).

References 

Rivers of Perm Krai
Rivers of the Komi Republic